Gronovius is a surname. It is a latinised form of the surname Gronow. Notable people with the surname include:

 Johann Friedrich Gronovius (1611–1671), German classical scholar and critic;
 Jakob Gronovius (1645–1716), Dutch classical scholar;
 Jan Frederik Gronovius (also Johannes Fredericus) (1686–1762), Dutch botanist;
 Laurens Theodorus Gronovius (1730–1777), Dutch botanist.